South Carolina elected its member October 8–9, 1810.

See also 
 South Carolina's 1st congressional district special election, 1810
 United States House of Representatives elections, 1810 and 1811
 List of United States representatives from South Carolina

Notes 

	

1810
South Carolina
United States House of Representatives